Sanguinograptis is a genus of moths belonging to the subfamily Tortricinae of the family Tortricidae.
All species in this genus are found in Africa.

Species
Sanguinograptis albardana (Snellen, 1872)
Sanguinograptis obtrecator Razowski, 1981
Sanguinograptis ochrolegnia Razowski, 1986
Sanguinograptis prosphora Razowski & Wojtusiak, 2012

See also
List of Tortricidae genera

References

  2005: World Catalogue of Insects vol. 5 Tortricidae.
 , 1981: Nigerian Tortricini (Lepidoptera, Tortricidae). Razowski, Acta Zoologica Cracoviensia 25 (14): 319–340.
  1986: The data on Tortricini (Lepidoptera, Tortricidae) published after 1966. , Acta zoologica cracoviensia, 29: 423–4440. full article.
 ;  2012: Tortricidae (Lepidoptera) from Nigeria. ,Acta zoologica cracoviensia, 55 (2): 59-130. Full article (pdf)

External links
Tortricid.net

Tortricini
Tortricidae genera
Taxa named by Józef Razowski